A referendum on community service was held in Iceland on 21 October 1916. Voters were asked whether they approved of introduction of compulsory community service. It was rejected by 91.8% of voters.

Results

References

Referendums in Iceland
1916 referendums
1916 in Iceland
Conscription referendums
October 1916 events